Hibiscus Town is a 1986 Chinese film directed by Xie Jin, based on a novel by the same name written by Gu Hua. The film, a melodrama, follows the life and travails of a young woman who lives through the turmoil of the Cultural Revolution and as such is an example of the "scar drama" genre that emerged in the 1980s and 1990s that detailed life during that period. The film was produced by the Shanghai Film Studio.

The film won Best Film for 1987 Golden Rooster Awards and Hundred Flowers Awards, as well as Best Actress awards for Liu Xiaoqing at both ceremonies. It was also selected as the Chinese entry for the Best Foreign Language Film at the 60th Academy Awards, but was not accepted as a nominee.

The village in Hunan province where the film was made was initially known as Wang Village (pinyin: Wáng cūn). In 2007, the village was renamed Furong zhen owing to this film.

Plot
The film follows Hu Yuyin (Liu Xiaoqing), a young and hardworking woman in a small Chinese town on the eve of the Cultural Revolution. She is happily married and runs a successful roadside food stall, selling spicy beancurd. Yuyin is supported by Party members Li Mangeng (Zhang Guangbei), who once wanted to marry her, and Director Gu (Zheng Zaishi), a war veteran in charge of the granary. But in 1964 the Four Cleanups Movement sends a Party work-team to root out Rightists and capitalist roaders. The team is led by Li Guoxiang (Xu Songzi), a single woman, assisted by Wang Qiushe (Zhu Shibin), a former poor peasant who has lost his land because of his drinking. At a public struggle session, Yuyin is declared to be a "new rich peasant." Both her home and business are taken from her and her husband, Li Guigui (Liu Linian) is executed for trying to kill Li Guoxiang.

After the first waves of the Revolution have ended, Yuyin, now relegated to a lowly street sweeper, returns to the town. She then falls in love with Qin Shutian (Jiang Wen), who had come in the 1950s to collect local folksongs but was declared to be one of the Five Black Categories. When Yuyin becomes pregnant, however, this loving relationship attracts the outrage of Li Guoxiang and Wang Qiushe, who themselves are having a secret affair. Shutian is sent to reform through labor and it is not until Deng Xiaoping's reforms in 1978 that his case is reviewed and he is allowed to return and help Yuyin re-establish their food stall. At the end of the film, Li Guoxiang continues to hold a position in the bureaucracy while Wang Qiushe loses his mind.

Cast
 Liu Xiaoqing as Hu Yuyin, the film's heroine, a young woman who is caught up in the political turmoil of China's Cultural Revolution. She originally sells rice beancurd with her husband.
 Liu Linian as Li Guigui, Yuyin's first husband
 Jiang Wen as Qin Shutian, a "bourgeoisie" rightist who falls in love with Yuyin
 Zheng Zaishi as Gu Yanshan, the granary director
 Zhu Shibin as Wang Qiushe
 Xu Songzi as Li Guoxiang 
 Zhang Guangbei as Li Mangeng

Reception
The film was well received domestically and was voted by Chinese film audiences as one of the three best films of 1987 in the Hundred Flowers Awards. It remains quite obscure outside China.

Gilbert Adair of Time Out magazine gave the film his endorsement, calling it "a potent blend of the political and personal":

"Xie's portrait of China's traumatic, turbulent history ranges from '63 to the post-'Gang of Four' years, his palette the changing fortunes of an entangled group of individuals. It's impressive both for the elegant precision with which the director fills his scope frame with small, significant details, and for the discreet understatement that controls his own special brand of epic melodrama. In some ways similar to the classic romances of Frank Borzage, Hibiscus Town is a moving account of survival in the face of widespread social and political madness, told with clarity, compassion and insight."

Awards
 Golden Rooster Awards, 1987
 Best Film
 Best Actress — Liu Xiaoqing
 Best Supporting Actress — Xu Songzi
 Best Art Direction— Jin Qifen
 Hundred Flowers Awards, 1987
 Best Film — tied with Dr. Sun Yat-sen and Xue zhan Taierzhuang
 Best Actor — Jiang Wen
 Best Actress — Liu Xiaoqing
 Best Supporting Actor — Zhu Shibin
 Karlovy Vary International Film Festival, 1988
 Crystal Globe, Grand Prix

See also 
 Cultural Revolution
 List of submissions to the 60th Academy Awards for Best Foreign Language Film
 List of Chinese submissions for the Academy Award for Best Foreign Language Film

Further reading 
 Browne, Nick. "Society and Subjectivity: On the Political Economy of Chinese Melodrama," in New Chinese Cinemas: Forms, Identities, Politics. Cambridge: CUP, 1994, 57-87.
 Hayford, Charles W. "Hibiscus Town: Revolution, Love and Bean Curd." In Chris Berry, ed., Chinese Films in Focus: 25 New Takes. London: BFI Publishing, 2003, 120-27.
 Kipnis, Andrew. "Anti-Maoist Gender: Hibiscus Town's Naturalization of a Dengist Sex/Gender/Kinship System." Asian Cinema 8, 2 (Winter 1996-97): 66-75.

References

External links
 
 
 Hibiscus Town article from China.org
 Hibiscus Town from the Chinese Movie Database
 Overview and questions of Hibiscus Town from Ohio State University

1986 films
1986 drama films
1980s pregnancy films
Chinese drama films
1980s Mandarin-language films
Golden Rooster Best Film recipients
Films directed by Xie Jin
Films about the Cultural Revolution
Films based on Chinese novels
Films set in 1964
Films set in 1978
Films shot in Hunan
Crystal Globe winners
Shanghai Film Studio films
Films with screenplays by Ah Cheng
Melodrama films